= London History Day =

- Genre: Cultural events, special activities and exhibitions.
- Frequency: Annually
- Locations: London, United Kingdom
- Website: historicengland.org.uk/get-involved/protect/keep-it-london/london-history-day

London History Day is an annual celebration in London that takes place on 31 May, the day that Big Ben first started keeping time.

== History ==
In May 2016 Historic England launched an online poll through YouGov asking the public to choose the most relevant date to celebrate London's history. 24% of people chose the day that Big Ben first kept time in 1859. The first London History Day took place on 31 May 2017. Over 40 historic and cultural institutions hosted special events or highlighted rare objects in their collection.

=== 2020 ===
The fourth London History Day took place during the COVID-19 pandemic. Historic England and the Museum of London created a booklet to help families celebrate the day without leaving their homes. London residents were encouraged to celebrate from home by dressing up as a well-known person in London history using items they could find in their homes.
